Jimmy Brown is a Scottish former association football manager. He was the manager from March 1999 to October 2000 of Dumbarton.

Having gone through a mediocre first season in charge, he resigned from his position in the autumn of 2000. Brown was succeeded by his former assistant Tom Carson.

Managerial Statistics

References 

Dumbarton F.C. managers
Living people
Scottish Football League managers
Year of birth missing (living people)
Scottish football managers